"Bluer Than Blue" is a 1978 song recorded by Michael Johnson. The song was written by noted pop and country songwriter Randy Goodrum. Originally recorded as a demo, "Bluer Than Blue" was taken as the first single from Johnson's subsequent LP, The Michael Johnson Album. The song is from the point of view of a man who is in a failing relationship, and is trying to convince himself that his situation will improve once the one he loved moves on; however, it is evident by the lyrics to the song his efforts are thus far ineffective.

The song became the singer's first top 40 hit, reaching #12 on the Billboard Hot 100 chart in summer 1978. It also reached #10 on the Cash Box chart. It proved even more popular with adult contemporary radio stations, spending three weeks at #1 on the Easy Listening chart that same year. To date, this is Johnson's highest-charting single on the Pop and Adult Contemporary charts. The song has become a well-known American 1970s soft rock single that continues to be played on radio stations.

The single received generally favourable reviews at the time of its release. Cashbox Magazine described Johnson's work as "full of touching ballads with all the right production touches, subtle instrumentation and poignant vocals necessary to keep the tenderness from becoming insipid." In 1978, Johnson was quoted as saying, "I knew it was potentially a successful song but I didn't think it would go this far.  It seemed, well, too mature.  The experience of being married or living with someone is hard to identify with for younger people."

Cover versions
Singapore-born Anita Sarawak recorded this song in her album in 1979.
Ruby Wilson recorded the song, which was later included in her 1981 album Ruby Wilson.
Filipina singer Regine Velasquez recorded the song and was later included in her 1996 cover album Retro.
In 1996, Barry Manilow covered the song on his album Summer of '78.
Joel Palencia covered the song in early 2015.

Chart performance

Weekly singles charts

Year-end charts

See also
List of number-one adult contemporary singles of 1978 (U.S.)

References

External links
 Song lyrics
 

1978 songs
1978 singles
Michael Johnson (singer) songs
Songs written by Randy Goodrum
Pop ballads
Torch songs
Song recordings produced by Brent Maher
Barry Manilow songs
EMI America Records singles